The 2017–18 FA Cup qualifying rounds open the 137th season of competition in England for The Football Association Challenge Cup (FA Cup), the world's oldest association football single knockout competition. A total of 737 teams were accepted for the competition, an increase of 1 from the previous season's 736.

The large number (645) of non-League clubs entering the tournament, from (Levels 5 to 10) in the English football pyramid, required the competition to start with six rounds of preliminary (2) and qualifying (4) knockout matches. The 32 winning teams from the fourth qualifying round progressed to the First round proper, where League teams tiered at Levels 3 and 4 entered the competition.

Calendar and prizes
The calendar for the 2017–18 FA Cup qualifying rounds, as announced by The Football Association.

Extra preliminary round
The Extra Preliminary round draw was held on 7 July 2017. Fixtures were played on Friday 4, Saturday 5 and Sunday 6 August 2017; replays were completed on Wednesday 16 August 2017. 370 teams, from Level 9 and Level 10 of English football, entered at this stage of the competition. The round included 76 teams from Level 10 of English football, the lowest ranked clubs to compete in the tournament.

Preliminary round
The Preliminary round draw was also held on 7 July 2017. Fixtures were played on Friday 18, Saturday 19 and Sunday 20 August 2017; replays were concluded Monday 28 August 2017. 320 teams took part in this stage of the competition: 185 winners from the Extra preliminary round and 135 entering at this stage from the six leagues at Level 8 of English football; Guernsey decided not to participate in the FA Cup this season. The round included 28 teams from Level 10, the lowest-ranked teams still in the competition.

First qualifying round
The First qualifying round draw was held on 21 August 2017. Fixtures were played on Friday 1, Saturday 2 and Sunday 3 September 2017.  All replays were completed by Wednesday 6 September 2017. 232 teams took part in this stage of the competition: 160 winners from the preliminary round and 72 entering at this stage from the three leagues at Level 7 of English football. The round included nine teams from Level 10, the lowest-ranked teams still in the competition.

Second qualifying round
The Second qualifying round draw was held on 4 September 2017. Fixtures were played on Saturday 16 and Sunday 17 September 2017; replays concluded Tuesday 26 September 2017. 160 teams took part in this stage of the competition: 116 winners from the first qualifying round and 44 entering at this stage from the two leagues at Level 6 of English football. The round included Baldock Town, Bodmin Town and Tavistock from Level 10, the lowest-ranked teams still in the competition.

Third qualifying round
The Third qualifying round draw took place on 18 September 2017. Fixtures were played on Saturday 30 September 2017; all replays were completed by Tuesday 3 October 2017. 80 winning teams from the second qualifying round took part in this stage of the competition. No additional teams entered at this stage. The round included seven teams from Level 9 of the football pyramid, which were the lowest-ranked teams still in the competition.

Fourth qualifying round
The Fourth qualifying round draw took place on 2 October 2017. Fixtures were played on Saturday 14 October 2017 and Sunday 15 October 2017; all replays were completed by Tuesday 17 October 2017. 64 teams took part in this stage of the competition: 40 winners from the third qualifying round and the 24 members of the National League who entered at this stage, representing Level 5 of English football. The round included Shildon from Level 9 of the football pyramid, the lowest-ranked team still in the competition.

Competition proper

Winners from the fourth qualifying round advanced to the First round proper, where teams from League One (Level 3) and League Two (Level 4) of English football, operating in the English Football League, entered the competition.

Broadcasting rights
The qualifying rounds aren't covered by the FA Cup's broadcasting contracts held by BBC Sport and BT Sport, although one game per round will be broadcast by the BBC on its media platforms.

The following qualifying rounds matches were broadcast live in the UK:

References

External links
 The FA Cup

qualifying rounds
FA Cup qualifying rounds